Thelosia jorgenseni is a moth in the Apatelodidae family. It was described by William Schaus in 1927. It is found in Paraguay.

The wingspan is about 25 mm. The forewings are cinnamon buff, the base shaded with cinnamon. The hindwings are clay color, but the termen are cinnamon buff.

References

Natural History Museum Lepidoptera generic names catalog

Apatelodidae
Moths described in 1927
Moths of South America